Zino is a Greek social networking site.

Zino may also refer to

People 
 Zino Davidoff, founder of Davidoff, a tobacco brand
 Zino Francescatti (1902–1991), French violinist
 Zino Vinnikov (born 1943), Russian-Dutch violinist
 Lotem Zino (born 1992), Israeli footballer
 Paul Alexander Zino (1916–2004), British businessman and ornithologist
 Haim Zinovitch, half of Zino & Tommy, an Israeli musical duo

Other uses 
 Zino (horse), a racehorse
 Zino 300, HD 400 and HD 410, models of Dell Inspiron desktop computers
 A variety of the hypothetical gaugino particle

See also 
 Zino's petrel, a seabird